Herta-Maria Perschy (23 September 1938 – 3 December 2004) was an Austrian actress whose career included performances on screen with actor Rock Hudson and on American television in both daytime and prime time.

Early life 
Perschy was born in Eisenstadt, Burgenland, Austria and moved to Vienna at the age of 17 to study acting.

Career 
After completing her education, she moved to Germany for more training, leading to a film career. Her first major success came with Nasser Asphalt where she played together with Horst Buchholz. Her acting career would eventually take her — by way of France, Italy and the United Kingdom — to Hollywood. Perschy played in a number of American films, her most notable roles being in the 1962 biopic Freud, the 1964 Rock Hudson comedy, Man's Favorite Sport?, and the 1964 hit war movie 633 Squadron.  Perschy's career in America eventually declined and by the late 1970s her only US appearances were brief roles in TV shows such as Hawaii Five-O and General Hospital.

While shooting in Spain in 1971, Perschy suffered a burn injury from an accident that required several operations before she could resume her career. Perschy returned to her native Austria in 1985 and continued to perform in a series of plays and TV series.

In 1972, she filmed Castle of Fu Manchu with Christopher Lee and Richard Greene. When it aired on television in New York City four years later, The New York Times noted that the film would be "[w]ell worth viewing, if it's as sharp and fast as others in this new series".

Death 
On 3 December 2004, Perschy died of cancer in Vienna.

Selected filmography

References

External links 
 
 

1938 births
2004 deaths
Austrian film actresses
Austrian television actresses
20th-century Austrian actresses
Deaths from cancer in Austria
People from Eisenstadt